This list of mines in Pakistan is subsidiary to the list of mines article and lists working, defunct and future mines in the country and is organised by the primary mineral output. For practical purposes stone, marble and other quarries may be included in this list.

Coal 
Chamalang Coal Mines
Indus East coal mine
Jherruck coal mine
Jhimpir coal mine
Lakhra coal mine
Ongar coal mine
Saleh Jo Tar coal mine
Salt Range coal mine
Singharo Bhitro coal mine
Sinhar Vikian Varvai coal mine
Sonalba coal mine
Sonda-Thatta coal mine

Copper 
Reko Diq Mine

Gemstone 
Chumar Bakhoor

Gold 
Reko Diq Mine

Gypsum 
Dadukhel mine
Dera Ismail Khan mine
Khewra mine
Kohat mine
Mawand mine
Rakhi-Munh mine

Lead 
Duddar mine

Magnesium
Kumhar mine

Salt

Sodium Chloride
Bahadurkhel mine

Zinc 
Duddar mine

References

 
Pakistan
Mines
Mines